In graph theory, a branch of mathematics, the splittance of an undirected graph measures its distance from a split graph. A split graph is a graph whose vertices can be partitioned into an independent set (with no edges within this subset) and a clique (having all possible edges within this subset). The splittance is the smallest number of edge additions and removals that transform the given graph into a split graph.

Calculation from degree sequence
The splittance of a graph can be calculated only from the degree sequence of the graph, without examining the detailed structure of the graph.

The given graph is a split graph already if . Otherwise, it can be made into a split graph by calculating , adding all missing edges between pairs of the  vertices of maximum degree, and removing all edges between pairs of the remaining vertices. As a consequence, the splittance and a sequence of edge additions and removals that realize it can be computed in linear time.

Applications
The splittance of a graph has been used in parameterized complexity as a parameter to describe the efficiency of algorithms. For instance, graph coloring is fixed-parameter tractable under this parameter: it is possible to optimally color the graphs of bounded splittance in linear time.

References

Graph invariants